The Vrouwen Eredivisie (Dutch for Honor Division, Eredivisie Vrouwen before 2020), also known as the Azerion Eredivisie Vrouwen due to a 3 year sponsor contract starting from the 2022–2023 season, is the highest women's football league in the Netherlands. Organized by the Royal Dutch Football Association (KNVB) it was established in 2007 as a professional league and played for five seasons until 2012 when the leagues of the Netherlands and Belgium merged forming a single combined league (BeNe League). After three seasons the BeNe League folded and the Eredivisie was restarted in the 2015–16 season. The league winner receives a spot in the UEFA Women's Champions League.

History

Background
Since the 1970s amateur women's football competitions have been played in the Netherlands with the Hoofdklasse being the highest level. During the 1990s the popularity of women's football rose with the sport becoming an Olympic event in 1996 and hundreds of thousands of tickets sold during the 1999 FIFA Women's World Cup. With the Netherlands women's national football team unable to qualify to major tournaments such as FIFA Women's World Cups, UEFA Women's Euros or Olympic Games and the most talented female players leaving for Germany or other countries with professional leagues, the Royal Dutch Football Association (KNVB) felt compelled to act.

In January 2007, the KNVB presented plans of the Eredivisie Vrouwen, a professional women's league. A number of clubs were interested and on 20 March 2007, the league was officially unveiled by the KNVB for three seasons with the first scheduled for 2007–08 with six clubs taking part (ADO Den Haag, AZ, SC Heerenveen, FC Twente, FC Utrecht and Willem II).

According to the league's business plan, initially the national team players were divided amongst the six clubs, apart from organizing the league the KNVB provided a start-up subsidy, contribution to the costs and technical assistance to the professional clubs, which in return should provide technical and medical staff, transport, training and other facilities to their players. The clubs also had to affiliate an amateur club who would use players coming back from injury or reserve players or young talented players from the professional club. The idea was to expand the league from 6 to 10-12 clubs in 5–8 years.

2007–2012

On 29 August 2007 the opening ceremony for the launch of the Eredivisie Vrouwen took place at the Arke Stadion in Enschede, with the presentation of the six participating teams, ahead of the league's inaugural match played by FC Twente and SC Heerenveen in front of 5.500 spectators. Visitors SC Heerenveen won the match 3–2 and Marieke van Ottele scored the first ever Eredivisie goal for FC Twente after 73 seconds in the match. At the end of the 2007–08 season, AZ were crowned the first Eredivisie champions and Karin Stevens the top scorer with 20 goals.

On 15 April 2008, Roda JC was confirmed as the seventh team for the 2008–09 season. AZ won the championship for a second year running and Sylvia Smit was the top scorer with 14 goals.

On 5 May 2009, financial problems forced Roda JC to announce its withdraw from the Eredivisie. Six teams participated in the 2009–10 season which for a third consecutive season was won by AZ and had Sylvia Smit (for a second consecutive season) and Chantal de Ridder as top scorers with 11 goals each.

Two new teams joined the league (VVV-Venlo and FC Zwolle) on 10 March 2010, taking the total of participating teams to eight for the 2010–11 season. At the end of the season FC Twente won its first league title, breaking AZ three year championship hegemony. Chantal de Ridder was the top scorer for a second consecutive season with 19 goals.

Changes ahead of 2011–12
On 22 February 2011, during the second half of the 2010–11 season, a meeting between the League (Stichting Eredivisie Vrouwen - SEV), KNVB and clubs was held to discuss possible improvement to the league. A statement from the KNVB announced that from next season matchdays would move from Thursdays to Fridays, relationship changes between clubs and their affiliated amateur clubs, guideline principles amongst other topics discussed and the financial conditions were to be discussed on a further meeting, as the KNVB was trying to keep the league with eight teams next season. At the same day following the meeting, three time league champions AZ announced it would withdraw from the league once the season was completed. On the following day Willem II announced it was also withdrawing from the league's next season. Financial issues were responsible for both clubs decision. PSV, working to build a women's team, confirmed on 3 March 2011 it would not be able to participate in the next season. On 8 March 2011, FC Utrecht also announced its withdraw from next season also due to financial reasons, but on 6 April 2011 retreated its withdraw and confirmed it had secured finances for one more season. On 14 April 2011 it was SC Heerenveen who announced its withdraw due to financial issues, two weeks later, on 26 April 2011, as the club continued working to find sponsors to remain in the league, RBC Roosendaal presented a possibility of entering a team if its male team remained in Jupiler League. The KNVB extension of the clubs registration deadline allowed SC Heerenveen to secure the funds needed to play another season and on 28 April 2011 the club confirmed its participation. On 27 May 2011 SC Telstar was confirmed as the seventh team for the season.

The 2011–12 season was won by ADO Den Haag, the club first league title, and Priscilla de Vos was the top scorer with 16 goals. It was to be the Eredivisie last season, as on 30 August 2011 the KNVB and its Belgian counterpart (KBVB) presented a proposal to merge its respective women's professional leagues into a combined BeNe League. On 10 December 2010 the KBVB agreed to go ahead with the BeNe Lague and two days later the KNVB decided to stop investing in the Eredivisie Vrouwen for the next three years. On 13 February 2012 the KNVB announced it was also going ahead with the BeNe League and on 23 March 2012 it received approval from UEFA. The new league had its inaugural season in 2012–13.

2015–present
After three season the BeNe League folded at the end of the 2014–15 season. On 2 April 2015, the KNVB confirmed the restart of the Eredivisie Vrouwen with the participation of the seven Dutch clubs that played in the BeNe League's last season.

The 2015–16 season had Ajax and PSV, after both clubs established women's teams in 2012, making their debut in the Eredivisie Vrouwen alongside ADO Den Haag, SC Heerenveen, Telstar, FC Twente and PEC Zwolle which were all returning to the Eredivisie after the 2011–12 season. FC Twente won the title, its second Eredivisie title, and Jill Roord was the top scorer with 20 goals.

The 2016–17 season was played by eight clubs after Achilles '29 was confirmed as newcomers on 16 June 2016. Ajax won the title for the first time and Katja Snoeijs was the top scorer with 21 goals.

On 1 March 2017, Telstar announced it was being replaced by a new club called VV Alkmaar. On 10 April 2017, Excelsior Barendrecht became the ninth team for the 2017–18 season. On 21 April 2017, VV Alkmaar was officially formed.

On 26 April 2019, SC Heerenveen announced they will not take part in the 2019–20 season of the Eredivisie. Due to COVID-19, the 2019–20 season was concluded early, and no champion was named. For the 2020–21 season, the league was re-branded as Vrouwen Eredivisie and given a new logo with a stylized lioness.

On 31 March 2021, Feyenoord announced that the club would be joining the Eredivisie from the start of the 2021–22 season.

In January 2022 Dutch media started reporting that both Fortuna Sittard and Telstar would be competing in the Eredivisie the following season, taking the total to 11 clubs. For Telstar it meant a return after 5 years, while Fortuna was a newcomer. Both wanted to capitalise on the growing popularity of the women's game in the Netherlands

Format
For its first three seasons (2007–08 to 2009–10), the Eredivisie was played in a quadruple round-robin with teams playing each other four times a season, twice at home and twice away. For the next two season (2010–11 and 2011–12) it was changed to a triple round-robin, teams playing each other three times (once at home, once away with the third confrontation defined by a lottery-system before the season). In 2015–16 it revert to the original quadruple round-robin used in the first three seasons. From 2016 to 2017 the season was split in two parts, the regular season where all clubs play a triple round-robin format and the play-off where the best four teams of the regular season form a champions group and the remaining teams form a placement group, a double round-robin (one match home and one away) in each group. The points accumulated at the regular season are halved and added to the points of the play-off stage rounds. From the start of the 2021–22 season the league will move to a triple round-robin system with the playoffs being completely eliminated.

There is no relegation from the Eredivisie, although a relegation/promotion system was planned in the long run.

Teams

Current season

The following teams are contesting the 2022–23 season.

*=return after previously playing in the Eredivisie

Overview
Clubs performance per season.

Note: Eredivisie did not take place between 2012 and 2015 (see BeNe League).

Champions

Titles by club

Topscorers

Golden Shoe
From 2007 to 2012 the yearly Golden Shoe (Dutch: Gouden Schoen) was awarded to the best player of the Eredivisie Vrouwen.
The "Vrouw & Voetbal" magazine started the competition in 2007. The winner receives a golden shoe-shaped trophy.
In the season 2009–10 the organisation and election was taken over by "Vrouwenvoetbal Nederland" who added an award for the best goalkeeper and in the season 2010–11 an award for the best talented player was created.

Naming Rights
In Februari 2021 it was announced that Pure Energie had signed a contract with the KNVB for the right to rename the Vrouwen Eredivisie. Prior to the 2022-23 season Azerion took over these rights.

Broadcasting
As of the 2022–23 season, league matches played on Sunday are broadcast on ESPN. Public service broadcaster NOS occasionally broadcasts some Sunday games live and provides game highlights during the Studio Sport programme.

See also
 BeNe League
 KNVB Women's Cup
 Women's football in the Netherlands

References

External links
 Vrouwenvoetbalnederland.nl 
 League at soccerway.com, standings, results & fixtures

 
Netherlands
Women's football leagues in the Netherlands
2007 establishments in the Netherlands
2012 disestablishments in the Netherlands
Professional sports leagues in the Netherlands